Acropolis Institute of Pharmaceutical Education and Research (AITR) is a private college located in Indore, Madhya Pradesh, India. It was established in 2005. The college is affiliated to Rajiv Gandhi Proudyogiki Vishwavidyalaya and it is part of Acropolis Group.

Notable alumni
Nikita Singh

References

External links
 Acropolis Institute of Technology and Research. Courses offered: BE, MTech, Diploma, MCA, MBA.
 Acropolis Institute of Management Studies & Research. Courses offered: BCA, BBA, BCom, BSc, BA.
 Acropolis Institute of Pharmaceutical Education & Research. Courses offered: B Pharm and M Pharm.
 Acropolis Faculty of Management and Research. Course offered: MBA.
 Acropolis Technical Campus. Courses offered: Diploma Engineering, BE, MBA.
 Acropolis Group of Institutions 

Universities and colleges in Indore
Educational institutions established in 2005
2005 establishments in Madhya Pradesh